The Lufeng Dinosaur Museum is located in Jingshan ("Golden Hill"), Lufeng County, Yunnan Province, China.  

Lufeng is the site of numerous Jurassic dinosaur discoveries, first found there in 1938.  Most well known is Lufengosaurus, a Jurassic prosauropod.  More recently, teeth and a skull of Ramapithecus, a Miocene period primate related to the orangutan, have been found in Lufeng.  

The Lufeng Dinosaur Museum includes the hall of ancient living beings where four complete dinosaur skeletons ranging from 2.4 meters to 9 meters in length are on display.  In addition, there is a display of photographs and diagrams of dinosaurs from around the world.  The museum includes  the hall of ancient bronzeware and earthenware and the hall of ancient Pithecanthropus.

References

See also
 List of museums in China

Dinosaur museums in China
Museums in Yunnan
Buildings and structures in Chuxiong Yi Autonomous Prefecture